Statistics of the Scottish Football League in season 1907–08.

Scottish League Division One

Scottish League Division Two

See also
1907–08 in Scottish football

References

 
1907-08